Fated to Love You is a 2008 Taiwanese television series, starring Joe Chen, Ethan Juan, Baron Chen and Bianca Bai. The series was first broadcast in Taiwan on free-to-air Taiwan Television (TTV) (台視) from 16 March 2008 to 24 August 2008, every Sunday at 22:00 and cable TV Sanlih E-Television from 22 March 2008 to 30 August 2008, every Saturday at 21:00. It was produced by Sanlih E-Television and directed by Chen Ming Zhang with location filming in Taiwan, Hong Kong and Shanghai. The series was adapted into Korean and Thai language versions with the Thai series dubbed in Filipino for release in the Philippines.

The drama holds the record for the highest average single-episode rating at 10.91 with a peak at 13.64 for episode 20 broadcast on 27 July 2008, and broke the previous record held by The Prince Who Turns into a Frog. It was nominated in 2008 for six awards at the 43rd Golden Bell Awards, Taiwan. It was awarded the 2008 Best Television Series and Best Marketing Programme.

Fated to Love You was also reviewed by The Wall Street Journal.

Synopsis
Chen Xin Yi (Joe Chen) is a dowdy legal assistant at a large law firm, where she is known as 'The sticky note girl' — someone helpful, but easily dispensed with once a task is completed. Her co-workers frequently take advantage of her eager-to-please nature by dumping mindless tasks on her. She plans and pays for a romantic love cruise, hoping to lose her virginity to her boyfriend/coworker Gu Chi. Once on board, Xin Yi is devastated when she catches Gu Chi cheating on her and when he tells her that he planned to break up with her anyway.

Fellow passenger Ji Cun Xi (Ethan Juan), the wealthy sole heir of a toiletries company, plans to propose to his long-time ballerina girlfriend Anna (Bianca Bai) and sets about finalizing the preparations, unaware that she didn't board the ship. Anna has opted to accept the principal role of Odette in The Black Swan, a coup for an Asian ballerina. As she flies to New York City, she marvels at the thought that it's a dream come true for her to be on the world stage and surely Cun Xi would understand how important this was to her, even if it was the 11th time she had stood him up. Aware that Cun Xi planned to propose, she abandons him by choosing the ballet over the boyfriend, confident he would wait for her just once more.

In a huge mix-up involving drugs, a blackmail plot, and other mishaps, Xin Yi and Cun Xi wind up spending the afternoon in bed, both mistaking the other for their actual partners. Suddenly, Xin Yi's brother-in-law and his father burst in their suite to snap photos of Cun Xi and the prostitute they hired to lure him into an indelicate situation. They hope to blackmail him into stopping from closing their hair products factory on Ginger Island.

Although each vows to forget about the indelicate incident and to continue on with their lives, Xin Yi soon discovers that she's pregnant. Not wishing to tell Cun Xi, 
he finds out anyway, courtesy of the national news, no less!

Initially, she decides to have an abortion, but Cun Xi changes his mind at the last minute and offers to financially support Xin Yi until the birth. Her family rejects this idea, and tries to persuade Xin Yi that aborting is the best solution.
When Cun Xi's grandmother, Granny Ji, learns she is about to have a first great-grandchild, she is ecstatic and insists that they marry.

Cun Xi, angry and feeling trapped, forces Xin Yi to agree to a post-birth divorce and the relinquishment of the baby. In exchange for her silence, she will receive a handsome financial settlement. But she refuses his offer of compensation, leading him to question why she agreed to marry in the first place. Xin Yi tells him that giving the baby a happy family was her only priority, but now knows that it's not feasible, as they are not in love.

She starts up a friendship with Dylan, a kind young man from Shanghai, who sympathizes with her plight to be financially supported by Cun Xi while he berates her. Genuinely interested in Zin Yi, Dylan becomes her confidante and source of support in the face of Cun Xi's mistreatment. Dylan reveals to her that his lifetime goal is to find his long-lost biological sister, Dai Xin Yi, from whom he has been separated from since childhood.

Still besotted with Anna and still believing Xin Yi became pregnant to get money out of him, Cun Xi struggles between his selfishness and taking responsibility. Xin Yi feels deeply burdened by guilt for her mistake as she struggles to stand up for herself. Despite no longer wanting to be a dispensable sticky note in other people's lives, she resolves to not fall for Cun Xi. Xin Yi's simple and selfless nature soon endears her to Cun Xi's family and, eventually, to Cun Xi. Slowly, Cun Xi begins to realize his love for Xin Yi and the child she is carrying, leaving him to wonder what life would be like if they lived together as a family. He desires to protect Xin Yi from those who would mistreat her and decides that he doesn't want her to leave him after the baby is born.

Unfortunately, his epiphanies are interrupted by the unexpected return of the injured Anna. In order to conceal his marriage and impending fatherhood, Cun Xi requests that Xin Yi return to her mother's home, until such time that he can explain the situation to Anna and his grandmother. Unfortunate events lead the devastated Anna to discover the truth while engaged in an ugly confrontation with Cun Xi's incensed grandmother. Enraged, Cun Xi blames Xin Yi for ruining his life and accuses her of telling his grandmother, in an effort to force him to stay with her. He moves out of the house to live with Anna.

Cun Xi later regrets his angry outburst and worries constantly about Xin Yi and the baby. He decides to return to his original plan to care for Xin Yi until she gives birth, requesting that Anna be considerate of the situation and to wait for him during the remaining months. He has new divorce terms written up that ensure Xin Yi will be generously taken care of for the rest of her life. Anna, worried that Cun Xi will leave her, delivers a fake abortion agreement to Xin Yi, indicating it's from Cun Xi. Horrified, a distraught Xin Yi decides to leave and raise the child alone.

During an ugly confrontation at Grandma Ji's birthday party, Cun Xi finally realizes his true feelings for Xin Yi and departs the celebration to look for her. Upon locating her, she pleads with him to leave her alone. As she tries to escape, she distractedly crosses the street into traffic and is hit by a car, leaving Cun Xi in shock. At the hospital, Cun Xi is advised by the doctor that an emergency abortion is required to save Xin Yi's life and that time is of the essence. Cun Xi has no choice but to sign the consent form, while Xin Yi emphatically begs him not to.

When Xin Yi recovers, she refuses to see Cun Xi. To escape both her grief and Cun Xi, she changes her name and plans a move to Shanghai with Dylan. Before she leaves, she signs the divorce papers, leaving Cun Xi vowing to find her one day.

Two years later, Xin Yi, no longer the sticky note girl, is now a successful pottery teacher, and her relationship with Dylan is deepening. Despite being engaged to Anna, Cun Xi continues his search for Xin Yi. He eventually finds her, only to realize that he never filed their divorce papers, and that they are still married! Jealous of Dylan, Cun Xi tries many tricks to coax Xin Yi to interact with him. At the same time, he hopes that she can forgive him for how he treated her and to prove to her that his love for her is indeed genuine. But Xin Yi is incapable of forgiving him, and accuses him of being relieved that she lost the baby. In the face of this rejection, Cun Xi decides to go along with marrying Anna. But when Xin Yi visits the island some two years later, Cun Xi learns that Anna was the one who created the faux abortion papers and that was why Xin Yi hated him. Furious, Cun Xi cancels the wedding with the heartbroken Anna. Then he attempts to make amends to Xin Yi by telling her that he didn't want her to get rid of the baby. Xin Yi is still reluctant to forgive him, but allows him to explain. Afterwards, with her reawakened feelings of love, Xin Yi forgives him and they reconcile. Meanwhile, Dylan finds his long-lost sister and the two siblings reunite.

As payback for the tricks Cun Xi played on her, Xin Yi convinces him to get into a barrel which she hits causing him to roll off a hill. He becomes temporarily blinded, causing Xin Yi to stay with him until his sight returns. It returned the next day, but he did not tell Xin Yi, in order to keep her by his side a bit longer. Of course she exposes his charade. She realizes that he has tricked her again, but acknowledges to herself that she still has feelings for him. She visits her doctor to see if she can conceive again, but is told that the chances of her carrying to term are quite low due to her miscarriage. Later in the day, Cun Xi asks Xin Yi to marry him but she declines, knowing how much Cun Xi's grandmother wants an heir for the Ji family's tenth generation. Sadly she chooses to tell Cun Xi that she wants a relationship with Dylan because she finds him more suitable. With the persuasion of Cun Xi and the support of both their families, she finally relents and a formal wedding is held. Shortly there after, she becomes ill and while hospitalized she learns that she was misled about her ability to carry to term. Subsequently Xin Yi learns she is pregnant, gives birth to a baby they name Ji Nian Ri, as a testament to all the wonderful memories she and Cun Xi have shared together.

Cast

Production
 The production cost for the first episode was more than NT $5,000,000.
 Ethan Juan and Joe Chen reprised their role as Ji Cun Xi and Chen Xin Yi in a cameo appearance in the first episode of Invincible Shan Bao Mei.
 Anna's name was named after the beautiful and talented ballerina, Anna Pavlova.

Soundtrack

Fated to Love You Original Soundtrack (命中注定我愛你 電視原聲帶) was released on April 18, 2008 by Various Artists under Rock Records. It contains fifteen songs, in which three songs are various instrumental versions of the five original songs, and another three songs that are kala versions. The album was released in two versions: the regular edition (CD) with shiny Post-It Card, and the deluxe edition (2CD+DVD) with an additional eleven track CD and a music video DVD. The opening theme song is "99次我愛他" or "99 Times I Love Him" by Shorty Yuen, while the ending theme song is by Quack Wu (吳忠明) and Shorty Yuen entitled "心願便利貼" or "Sticky Note With Wishes". The track, "心願便利貼" (Sticky Note With Wishes) was listed at number 50 on Hit Fm Taiwan's Hit Fm Annual Top 100 Singles Chart (Hit-Fm年度百首單曲) for 2008.

Track listing

Books
 13 June 2008: Fated to Love You Top Secret Behind-the-Scenes (命中注定我愛你 極機密幕後花絮) - 
 26 June 2008: Fated to Love You TV Drama Novel (命中注定我愛你 電視小說) -

International broadcast
Philippines: GMA Network 
Japan: BS NTV & DATV
Thailand: Channel 3

Remakes

A 2014 South Korean remake titled You Are My Destiny that starred Jang Hyuk and Jang Na-ra in the lead roles.

A 2017 Thailand remake starred Esther Supreeleela and Sukrit Wisetkaew on ONE HD 31 titled You're My Destiny.

The remake was broadcast in the Philippines by GMA Network (company) with high rating in audience share from its competing network.

A 2019 Cambodian remake of this drama by hangmeas production, Cast by (Nico,main actor and pich solika, main actress) Title fated to love you or ah pea pi pea jai dorn

A 2020 Japanese Remake titled Unmei Kara Hajimaru Koi: You Are My Destiny (運命から始まる恋 - You are my Destiny,  "Love starting from fate - You are my Destiny") that starred Miori Takimoto and Takumi Kizu. It airs on Fuji TV starting February 12, 2020.

A 2020 Chinese Remake titled You are My Destiny starring Xing Zhaolin and Liang Jie.

Awards and nominations

References

External links
TTV official homepage

Taiwanese drama television series
Taiwan Television original programming
2008 Taiwanese television series debuts
2008 Taiwanese television series endings
Taiwanese romance television series
Sanlih E-Television original programming